The Ugly Americans in Australia is a live album by American rock band Wall of Voodoo, mostly recorded at the Palace Theatre in Melbourne in August 1987, during the group's Australian tour.

Background
Bassist Bruce Moreland had departed the group again by this stage, and in order for Chas T. Gray to play bass in addition to his normal keyboard duties, the group took on guest keyboardist Roger Mason from popular Australian band the Models.

Two of the album's tracks, "Living in the Red" and "The Heart Never Can Tell", were recorded at Big Joe's Bar 'n Grill in Bullhead City, Arizona. The CD and cassette versions included another two tracks from Bullhead: "The Grass Is Greener" and a cover of Woody Guthrie's "Pretty Boy Floyd".

The album was dedicated to renowned German producer Conny Plank, who had died in December 1987. Plank had not worked with Wall of Voodoo, but his productions for such German progressive/experimental bands as Kraftwerk, Neu!, Cluster, Harmonia and Guru Guru were an influence on the group's music.

The album title and sleeve notes make reference to the bestselling 1958 exposé The Ugly American, by Eugene Burdick and William J. Lederer. The front cover painting was by iconic artist Robert Williams, featuring a vicious clown beating another with his fists while female conjoined twins in skimpy attire look on with astonished looks. The full title of Williams' painting is "An Allegory of Contradictions Revealing Serendipity Purveyors of Mirth Presenting a Tableau of Blood and Grease Paint in a Circusian Clash to the Death", while the colloquial title is "Duelling Bimbos".

This album completed the band's contract with IRS Records, and they disbanded by mid-1988.

Track listing

In 2012, the album was remastered and re-released by Australian reissue label Raven Records as part of a double CD set with the previous albums Seven Days in Sammystown and Happy Planet, as well as three non album bonus tracks.

Personnel
Wall of Voodoo
Chas T. Gray – keyboards, backing vocals, bass guitar
Ned Leukhardt – drums, percussion
Marc Moreland – guitars
Andy Prieboy – vocals, keyboards

Additional musician
Roger Mason – keyboards and backing vocals

Technical
Barry Rudolph – co-producer, mixing
Wall of Voodoo – co-producer, mixing
Greg Edward – engineer
Ernie Sheesly – co-engineer ("Living in the Red", "Pretty Boy Floyd", "The Heart Can Never Tell", "The Grass Is Greener")
Ryan Greene – co-engineer ("Living in the Red", "Pretty Boy Floyd", "The Heart Can Never Tell", "The Grass Is Greener")
Joseph Prieboy – back cover computer graphics
Andy Prieboy – layout
Ron Scarselli – layout

References

Wall of Voodoo albums
1988 live albums
I.R.S. Records live albums